The 1991–92 WKU Lady Toppers basketball team represents Western Kentucky University during the 1991–92 NCAA Division I women's basketball season. The Lady Toppers were led by head coach Paul Sanderford and Sun Belt Conference tournament Most Outstanding Player (MOP) Kim Pehlke. They won the Sun Belt Conference season and tournament championships and received an automatic bid to the 1992 NCAA Division I women's basketball tournament where they advanced to the National championship game. Pehlke and Paulette Monroe were named to the All-Conference team, and Pehlke and Renee Westmoreland made the SBC Tournament team. Pehlke was selected as the NCAA Mideast Region MOP with Monroe and Debbie Scott joining her on the All-Region team.  Pehlke made the NCAA All-Tournament team.

Schedule

|-
!colspan=6| Regular Season

|-

 

|-
!colspan=6| 1992 Sun Belt Conference women's basketball tournament

|-
!colspan=6| 1992 NCAA Division I women's basketball tournament

References

Western Kentucky Lady Toppers basketball seasons
Wku
Wku
NCAA Division I women's basketball tournament Final Four seasons
WKU Lady Toppers basketball team
WKU Lady Toppers basketball team